Ludlow is an unincorporated community in western McKean County, Pennsylvania, United States.  It is situated at 41°43´N, 78°56´W, within the Allegheny National Forest. U.S. Route 6 passes through the community.

Ludlow is home to the historic Olmsted Manor, as well as Wildcat Park.

References

Unincorporated communities in Pennsylvania
Unincorporated communities in McKean County, Pennsylvania